Resen is the name of several places:

 Resen Municipality, a municipality in North Macedonia
 Resen, North Macedonia, a town within the municipality
 Resen (Bosilegrad), a village in Serbia
 Resen (Bible), a city founded by Ashur according to Genesis 10
 Resen (crater), Martian impact crater
 Resen, Veliko Tarnovo Province, Bulgaria
 Sitaria, a village in Greece known in Macedonian as Resen